Pulse is a 2006 American horror film written by Wes Craven and Ray Wright, and directed by Jim Sonzero. It is a remake of Kiyoshi Kurosawa's 2001 Japanese horror film Kairo. The film stars Kristen Bell, Ian Somerhalder and Christina Milian. The film spawned two straight-to-DVD sequels: Pulse 2: Afterlife and Pulse 3, both released in 2008.

Plot
When Josh Ockmann (Jonathan Tucker) enters a dark university library intending to meet his friend Douglas Ziegler (Kel O'Neill), he is attacked by a humanoid spirit that sucks the life force out of him. Some days later, Josh's girlfriend, Mattie Webber (Kristen Bell), visits his apartment, seeing evidence that it has not been well kept. Josh tells Mattie to wait in the kitchen while he walks off. While waiting she finds Josh's pet cat, locked in a closet and dying from severe malnutrition. But when she rushes to tell him, she finds that he has committed suicide by hanging himself with an Internet cable.

Mattie and her friends begin to receive online messages from Josh asking for help, but assume that Josh's computer is still on and that a virus is creating the messages. Mattie learns that Josh's computer has been sold to Dex McCarthy (Ian Somerhalder), who finds a number of strange videos on the computer. Mattie receives a package that Josh mailed two days prior to his death. Inside are rolls of red tape and a message telling her that the tape keeps "them" out, although he does not know why. Later, Dex visits Mattie and shows her video messages that Josh was sending to Ziegler. Josh had hacked Ziegler's computer system and then distributed a virus. This virus had unlocked a portal that connected the realm of the living to the realm of the dead. Josh believed that he had coded a counter to the virus and wanted to meet Ziegler at the library. Josh's counter-program is found on a memory stick taped inside the PC case with red tape.

Dex and Mattie visit Ziegler and find his room entirely plastered in red tape. They believe that the red tape keeps the spirits out. Ziegler tells them of a project he worked on where he found "frequencies no one knew existed". Opening these frequencies somehow allowed the spirits to travel to the world of the living. Ziegler also tells them that these spirits "take away your will to live" and where to find the main server infected with the virus.

Dex and Mattie find the server and upload Josh's fix, causing the system to crash and the spirits to vanish. Moments later, however, the system reboots and the spirits return, leaving Mattie and Dex with no option but to flee the city by car. Over the car radio, Mattie and Dex hear a report from the Army announcing the location of several "safe zones" where there are no Internet connections, cell phones, or televisions. As Dex and Mattie are driving to a safe zone, a voice-over from Mattie is heard saying "We can never go back. The cities are theirs. Our lives are different now. What was meant to connect us to one another instead connected us to forces that we could have never imagined. The world we knew is gone, but the will to live never dies. Not for us, and not for them". The film closes by showing various clips of abandoned cities, which includes a window of an apartment with Josh looking through it.

Cast
 Kristen Bell as Mattie
 Ian Somerhalder as Dexter
 Christina Milian as Isabelle Fuentes
 Rick Gonzalez as Stone
 Jonathan Tucker as Josh
 Samm Levine as Tim
 Octavia Spencer as Landlady
 Ron Rifkin as Dr. Waterson
 Joseph Gatt as Dark Figure
 Kel O'Neill as Douglas Ziegler
 Zach Grenier as Professor Cardiff
 Riki Lindhome as Janelle
 Robert Clotworthy as Calvin
 Brad Dourif as Thin Bookish Guy
 Christine Barger as Goth Girl

Production

Development
Following the premiere of Pulse at the Un Certain Regard, Dimension Films acquired the rights to the Japanese film, as well as the rights to a remake. Wes Craven was attached to Pulse shortly thereafter. Kiyoshi Kurosawa, director of the original film, was initially expected to helm the remake before Craven became officially involved. By June 2002, Craven had written the script with Vince Gilligan while Kirsten Dunst was eyed for the lead role. Craven worked on the film up until 2003 when Harvey Weinstein and Bob Weinstein asked Craven to direct Cursed instead; Craven declined due to lack of interest. With ten days out from filming, the studio pulled the plug on the film as means to draw Craven onto Cursed. In April 2004, the project was revived. Jim Sonzero took over as director and worked with Hellraiser: Deader scribe Tim Day for rewrites. Day would later be replaced by Ray Wright.

Pre-production
In March 2005, reports indicated that Craven was still involved with the project. However, when talking to Fangoria at the time of the film's release, Craven said he was not involved in the making of the film. At the end of the month, Kristen Bell and Steve Talley joined the cast. Ian Somerhalder and Christina Milan rounded out the cast in April and June. Final additions to the cast included Jonathan Tucker, Corryn Cummins, Rick Gonzalez, Riki Lindhome, Samm Levine, Amanda Tepe, and Joseph Gatt.

Filming
Principal production for Pulse began in June 2005 in Romania.

Release
Pulse was released on August 11, 2006 by Dimension Films. The film was initially set for release on March 3, 2006.

Reception

Box office
The film grossed over $8 million in its opening weekend in the United States. By its close on October 12, 2006, the film had grossed just over $20 million in the U.S., along with the foreign-box-office total, just over $7.5 million, for a worldwide take of almost $28 million, compared with a production budget of approximately $20.5 million. As a DVD rental, the film has grossed a further $25 million.

Critical reception
Upon release, Pulse was negatively received by critics, with a 11% on Rotten Tomatoes based on 74 reviews, and an average rating of 3.63/10, with the consensus reading: "Another stale American remake of a successful Japanese horror film, Pulse bypasses the emotional substance of the original, and overcompensates with pumped-up visuals and every known horror cliche". On Metacritic, the film holds a 27 out of 100, indicating "generally unfavorable review".

Sequels
The film is followed by two sequels: Pulse 2: Afterlife, and Pulse 3.  Both were released in 2008, and were written and directed by Joel Soisson.

See also
 List of ghost films

References

External links
 
 
 
 
 

2006 films
2006 horror films
2006 psychological thriller films
American horror thriller films
2000s English-language films
Apocalyptic films
American dystopian films
American ghost films
Horror film remakes
American supernatural horror films
American remakes of Japanese films
Films based on adaptations
Dimension Films films
Films scored by Elia Cmíral
2006 directorial debut films
Films produced by Joel Soisson
Techno-horror films
2000s American films